Hebeloma mesophaeum is a species of mushroom in the family Hymenogastraceae. Like all species of its genus, it might be poisonous and result in severe gastrointestinal upset; nevertheless, in Mexico this species is eaten and widely marketed.

References 

mesophaeum
Fungi of Europe
Poisonous fungi